Balfron railway station was a railway station that served the village of Balfron in Scotland. The station was served by trains on the Strathendrick and Aberfoyle Railway and the Forth and Clyde Junction Railway, both of which closed in the 1950s.

A hamlet known as Balfron Station has since grown up around the site of the former station.

History
Opened by the Edinburgh and Glasgow (Forth and Clyde Junction Railway), and absorbed into the North British Railway, it became part of the London and North Eastern Railway during the Grouping of 1923. It passed on to the Scottish Region of British Railways on nationalisation in 1948.

The station was closed by British Railways in 1951.

Hamlet
Since the station's closure in 1951, a rural settlement has grown up around the former site of the station. The hamlet is served by Balfron Primary School and Balfron High School in the village of Balfron, 2 miles away.

References

Sources
 
 
 Balfron station on navigable OS map
 Picture of Station

External links
 RAILSCOT on Forth and Clyde Junction Railway
 Railscot on the Strathendrick and Aberfoyle Railway

Disused railway stations in Stirling (council area)
Railway stations in Great Britain opened in 1856
Railway stations in Great Britain closed in 1951
Former North British Railway stations